Stenoptilia leuconephes is a moth of the family Pterophoridae. It is found in Australia, including Tasmania.

External links
Australian Faunal Directory

Moths of Australia
leuconephes
Moths described in 1886